The Apple Industrial Design Group is the industrial design department within Apple Inc. responsible for crafting the physical appearance of all Apple products. The group was established so that Apple could design more products in-house, rather than relying on external design firms. Steve Jobs wanted to be a part of the design process more than was practical to do when utilizing external design agencies, and the in-house design group allowed for changes to be made more efficiently - all while making it easier to maintain the secrecy of upcoming projects.

History
Apple Industrial Design was established in April 1977 when Steve Jobs hired Jerry Manock to design the Apple II housing. Jobs was notoriously obsessed with design and style, rumored to linger over appliances at Macy's for inspiration. Jobs and Manock set about establishing the design language that would be used by Apple for the first 10 years.

In addition to the Apple II, Manock came to manage Apple Design Guild which consisted of a loose band of in-house designers, among them Bill Dresselhaus—responsible for the Lisa—and Rob Gemmell—responsible for the Apple IIe and IIc. It was from this group that a project called "Snow White" emerged. The importance that Jobs put on appearance led to a desire to begin the search for a "world-class" designer or design team to give Apple a unique and uniform design language. It was Manock's suggestion that it be made a contest and proceeded to solicit designers from the pages of magazines.

Frog Design
It was out of this contest that Hartmut Esslinger and his team at frog design came to Apple and created a unique design language that took the project's code name and helped establish Apple with a serious corporate image. Though Esslinger originally created a design for the Macintosh, it wasn't until the Apple IIc, designed with Rob Gemmell, that Apple would first introduce the new design language. From the introduction of the Apple II through the Macintosh Plus, Apple's products favored a beige-like color scheme of differing shades. The Apple IIc was the first to introduce a product with a lighter, creamy off-white color, known in-house as "Fog" (though Esslinger originally argued for bright white), a color that would persist in all Snow White design language products until the introduction of the Apple IIGS in late 1986, which marked a turning point in the unification of Apple products. Apple selected a warm gray color they called "Platinum" for the IIGS and all subsequent computers until the introduction of the iMac in 1998 (although a darker shade of gray was adopted for the PowerBook line and various peripherals).

The original Macintosh was designed by Jerry Manock and Terry Oyama with ample guidance from Steve Jobs. In doing so, they unwittingly created an enduring iconic design. Though variously redressed in "Snow White" details (such as the Macintosh SE), all the way to the translucent iMac, there is a legacy imparted by the original Macintosh design. Having worked 90-hour weeks, Manock and the rest of the Mac team were exhausted, and he failed to register the Macintoshes in time for the design award consideration. Esslinger would not make the same mistake with the SE and ultimately received the recognition denied Manock, which often led to Esslinger being credited with the original design of the Macintosh, a perception Esslinger and Frog Design always corrected. However, by the end of 1985, Steve Jobs resigned from Apple and Hartmut Esslinger and his Frog Design team followed, later working with Jobs at NeXT.

Reformation
By the early 1990s, Apple discovered that the Snow White language that had served them so well through the 80s was being copied by its generic IBM PC competitors, causing Apple to lose some of its unique identity. With the move away from Frog Design, Apple chose to bring all industrial design in-house by creating the Apple Industrial Design Group, headed by Robert Brunner except for portable computer devices design projects led by Kazuo Kawasaki. Though many of the new designs reflected the legacy of Esslinger's Snow White language, the new design group began to rapidly move in its direction, which can be clearly seen in landmark products of the Espresso language such as the Macintosh Color Classic. The list of innovative designs which clearly defined Apple products in the marketplace continued through the 90s.

Return of Steve Jobs
The return of Steve Jobs in 1997 ushered in a new era for Apple design, and the appointment of designer Jonathan Ive, drawing heavily on the design philosophy of Dieter Rams for Braun, and infusing them with vibrant color and translucent details. The launch of the iMac in 1998 also drew on some of the iconic elements of the original Macintosh, such as the all-in-one format and top-mounted handle.

The successive design language adopted by Apple can be split into two aspects: a white or black color scheme, usually with a glossy texture and plastic cases; and a bead blasted aluminum and glass look. The former was exclusively used for consumer products, such as the MacBook and iPod, while the latter was mainly used in professional products such as the MacBook Pro and Mac Pro. However, more recent revisions of the iMac, iPad, iPhone, and iPod lines have adopted the aluminum of the professional line with sleek black elements. Apple developed a unibody water-milling process to achieve sharp lines and graceful curves as well as end-to-end structural stability from their aluminum products. Both looks often use basic rectilinear forms modified with slight contours and rounded edges.

Resignation of Jonathan Ive 
Jonathan Ive left Apple and started his new design office LoveFrom with Marc Newson. Evans Hankey is the head of hardware design at the design group since June 2019. Apple announced on October 21, 2022, that Hankey would depart the company, but she'll remain at the company for a temporary period. Apple has not yet announced Hankey's replacement.

Apple designers

Timeline of Apple products

See also
 Design language
 Human interface guidelines
 AppleTalk Connector Family
 Susan Kare
 Apple Inc. design motifs

References

Apple Inc. subsidiaries
Apple Inc. industrial design